Abdulhamid Sulaymon oʻgʻli Yunusov (1893 – 4 October 1938), most commonly known by his penname Choʻlpon (sometimes spelled Cholpán in English), was an Uzbek poet, playwright, novelist, and literary translator. Choʻlpon was one of Central Asia's the most popular poets during the first half of the 20th century. He was also the first person to translate William Shakespeare's plays into the Uzbek language.

Choʻlpon's works had a major impact on the works of other Uzbek writers. He was one of the first authors to introduce realism into Uzbek literature. Choʻlpon was executed during the Great Purge under the leadership of Joseph Stalin.

Life 
Abdulhamid Sulaymon oʻgʻli Yunusov was born in 1893 in Andijan. His father, Sulaymonqul Mulla Muhammad Yunus oʻgʻli, was a learned man. Choʻlpon first studied at a madrasa. Later he enrolled in a Russian tuzem school, an elementary school for non-Russians in Turkestan.

From 1919 until 1920, Choʻlpon worked as editor-in-chief of the newspaper TurkROSTA. He also worked on the editorial board of many other publications, such as Ishtirokiyun, Qizil bayroq (The Red Flag), Turkiston (Turkestan), Buxoro axbori (Bukhara News), and Darhon.

Like many Uzbek authors of his time, such as Abdulla Qodiriy and Abdulrauf Fitrat, Choʻlpon was executed during the Great Purge under the leadership of Joseph Stalin. He was arrested as "enemy of the people" in 1937 and was killed on 4 October 1938.

Work 
Choʻlpon's first poems were published in Oʻzbek yosh shoirlari (Young Uzbek Poets), a collection of poems by young Uzbek poets, in 1922. His three collections of poems, namely, Uygʻonish (The Awakening) (1922), Buloqlar (The Springs) (1924), and Tong sirlari (The Secrets of Dawn) (1926) were published during his lifetime. Choʻlpon's novel Kecha va kunduz (Night and Day) is one of the most highly acclaimed novels in Uzbek literature.

Choʻlpon's works had a major impact on the works of other Uzbek writers. He was one of the first authors to introduce realism into Uzbek literature. Choʻlpon used clear and straightforward language in his works. He appealed to Uzbek national identity in some of his works, and because of it was criticized as a bourgeois nationalist in Soviet sources. He was finally rehabilitated during glasnost.

In addition to writing numerous poems, plays, and short stories, Choʻlpon translated the works of many famous foreign writers, such as Alexander Pushkin, Maxim Gorky, and William Shakespeare into the Uzbek language. In particular, he translated Shakespeare's Hamlet into Uzbek. He also translated Boris Godunov and Dubrovsky of Pushkin.

Dramas' 
Chulpan's early research in the field of drama dates back to 1919. In the same year, he wrote small stage works such as "Temirchi" ("Blacksmith"), "Gunoh" ("Sin"), "Cho'rining isyoni" ("Rebellion of the maid"). And in the early 20s, Chulpan's plays "Yorqinoy", "Xalil Farang" ("Khalil farang"), "Qotil" ("The killer") (1921), "Sevgi va Saltanat" ("Love and Kingdom"), "Cho'lpon sevgisi" ("Cho'lpon's love") (1922) had published (the accent of these works did not reach us).

References

1893 births
1938 deaths
Uzbeks
20th-century Uzbekistani poets
Translators from Russian
Translators to Uzbek
Uzbekistani translators
Soviet poets
Soviet male writers
20th-century male writers
20th-century translators
Uzbekistani male poets
Soviet translators
Great Purge victims from Uzbekistan
Uzbekistani novelists
Male novelists
People from Andijan
20th-century Uzbekistani writers